Barry Ward may refer to:

Barry Ward (actor), Irish actor
Barry Ward (Australian rules footballer) (born 1939), Australian footballer
Barry Ward (cricketer) (born 1961), New Zealand cricketer
Barry Ward (politician), Irish Fine Gael senator
Barry Ward (rugby league) (born 1971), rugby league player